Haar Jeet may refer to:

Haar Jeet (1940 film), an Indian Hindi-language film directed by Amar Mullick, starring Pahadi Sanyal and Kanan Devi
Haar Jeet (1954 film), an Indian Hindi-language film directed by Jaggi Rampal starring Manorama
Haar Jeet (1972 film), an Indian Hindi-language film directed by C.P. Dixit, starring Anil Dhawan, Rehana Sultan, Radha Saluja and Mehmood
Haar Jeet (1990 film), an Indian Hindi-language film directed by Avtar Bhogal, starring Kabir Bedi
Haar Jeet (TV series), an Indian soap from 2011 to 2012 aired on Imagine TV.